Acanthopagrus is a genus of fish in the family Sparidae found in the Indian and western Pacific Oceans.

Species
There are currently 20 recognized species in this genus:

 Acanthopagrus akazakii Iwatsuki, Kimura & Yoshino, 2006 (New Caledonian seabream) 
 Acanthopagrus arabicus Iwatsuki, 2013 (Arabian yellowfin seabream) 
 Acanthopagrus australis Günther, 1859 (Surf bream)
 Acanthopagrus berda Forsskål, 1775 (Goldsilk seabream)
 Acanthopagrus bifasciatus Forsskål, 1775 (Twobar seabream)
 Acanthopagrus butcheri Munro, 1949 (Southern black bream)
 Acanthopagrus catenula Lacépède, 1801 (Bridled seabream)
 Acanthopagrus chinshira Kume & Yoshino, 2008 (Okinawan yellowfin seabream)
 Acanthopagrus datnia Hamilton, 1822 (Bengal Yellowfin Seabream)
 Acanthopagrus latus Houttuyn, 1782 (Yellowfin seabream)
 Acanthopagrus morrisoni Iwatsuki, 2013 (Western yellowfin seabream) 
 Acanthopagrus omanensis Iwatsuki & Heemstra, 2010 (Black margined seabream)
 Acanthopagrus pacificus Iwatsuki, Kume & Yoshino, 2010 (Pacific seabream)
 Acanthopagrus palmaris Whiltey, 1935 (North West black bream)
 Acanthopagrus randalli Iwatsuki & K. E. Carpenter, 2009 (Middle East black seabream)
 Acanthopagrus schlegelii Bleeker, 1854 (Blackhead seabream)
 A. s. czerskii L. S. Berg, 1914
 A. s. schlegelii Bleeker, 1854
 Acanthopagrus sheim Iwatsuki, 2013 (Spotted yellowfin seabream) 
 Acanthopagrus sivicolus Akazaki, 1962 (Okinawa seabream)
 Acanthopagrus taiwanensis Iwatsuki & K. E. Carpenter, 2006 (Taiwan picnic seabream)
 Acanthopagrus vagus W. K. H. Peters, 1852 (Wandering seabream)

See also
Sparus

References

 
Marine fish genera
Taxa named by Wilhelm Peters